Nemotelus thomae is a species of soldier fly in the family Stratiomyidae.

Distribution
Virgin Islands.

References

Stratiomyidae
Insects described in 1928
Diptera of North America
Taxa named by Charles Howard Curran